Methyl perchlorate is an organic chemical compound. Like many other perchlorates, it is a high energy material. It is also a toxic alkylating agent and exposure to the vapor can cause death. It can be prepared by treating iodomethane with a solution of silver perchlorate in benzene.

References

Perchlorates
Methyl esters